Valentin Crețu may refer to:

 Valentin Crețu (luger) (born 1989), Romanian luger
 Valentin Crețu (footballer) (born 1989), Romanian footballer